Botn may refer to the following locations:

Botn, Evenes, a village in Evenes municipality, Nordland, Norway
Botn, Saltdal, a village in Saltdal municipality, Nordland, Norway
Botn (Sør-Trøndelag), a lake in Rissa municipality, Sør-Trøndelag, Norway

See also
 Battle of the Nations (Medieval Tournament)
Botnen (disambiguation)